Aphaenops coiffaitianus is a species of beetle in the subfamily Trechinae. It was described by A. Gaudin in 1947.

References

coiffaitianus
Beetles described in 1947